Boris Roatta (July 1, 1980 – August 25, 1994) was a French child actor who focused his career on film, television and voice dubbing.

Biography
Born in Paris, Roatta began his career on film as a child in the late 1980s. He began appearing on television in the early 1990s and he gained notice for his role as the title character’s son Frédéric Moulin in the popular television series Commissaire Moulin in which he only appeared in three episodes. He was also a voice actor, as he most notably dubbed the voice of Macaulay Culkin in the Home Alone film series as well as Getting Even with Dad.

In animation, Roatta provided the French dubbing voices of Flounder in The Little Mermaid and Cody in The Rescuers Down Under.

Death
On August 25, 1994, Roatta was struck by a car and was killed instantly while he was cycling across Aiguilles. He was 14 years old. He was laid to rest in a cemetery located in the same city where he died.

Filmography

Music video
"Petit Frank" (1990) - Frank

Cinema
Bonjour l'angoisse (1988) – Olivier

Television
Sabine j'imagine (1992) – Nicolas
Commissaire Moulin (1992–1993) – Frédéric Moulin
L'Instit (1993) – Paulo
Les Grandes Marées (1993) – David Marret
Le silence du cœur (1994) – Pierre Baumann

Dubbing
Cinema Paradiso (1988) – Salvatore Di Vita as a child
Uncle Buck (1989) – Miles’ friend
The Little Mermaid (1989) – Flounder
Home Alone (1990) – Kevin McCallister
The Rescuers Down Under (1990) – Cody
Kindergarten Cop (1990) – Dominic
City Slickers (1991) – Danny Robbins
The Jacksons: An American Dream (1992) – Michael Jackson (aged 9–14)
The Mighty Ducks (1992) – Terry Hall
Home Alone 2: Lost in New York (1992) – Kevin McCallister
Dennis the Menace (1993) – Joey
The Good Son (1993) – Henry Evans
Getting Even with Dad (1994) – Timmy Gleason
The Client (1994) – Mark Sway

Stage
La Ville dont le prince est un enfant (1993) – Serge Souplier

References

External links

1980 births
1994 deaths
Male actors from Paris
French male child actors
French male television actors
French male voice actors
French male stage actors
French male film actors
20th-century French male actors
Road incident deaths in France
Cycling road incident deaths